Edkins is a surname. Notable people with the surname include:

Don Edkins (born 1953), South African filmmaker and producer
Jenny Edkins, British political scientist
Joseph Edkins (1823–1905), British Protestant missionary, linguist, translator, and philologist

See also
Adkins